Jitu Rai (born 26 August 1987) is an Indian Army Subedar Major who competes in the 10 metre air pistol and 50 metre pistol events. The Government of India announced the Khel Ratna Award for him in 2016. In 2020, the Government of India honoured him with the Padma Shri, the fourth highest civilian award in the Republic of India.

Early life
His early life was spent in a village of Sankhuwa Sabha district of Nepal. He is the fourth brother among five siblings. He is a Subedar Major in the 11 Gorkha Rifles of Indian Army. Rai was born and grew up in Nepal, migrated to India and joined the Army in 2006. He is a naturalized citizen of India. He also has a certificate of participation in the 2011 National Games where he represented Uttar Pradesh.

Rai first made it to the Army's shooting squad in 2010-11 but failed to live up to expectations and was subsequently sent back to his unit, putting an end to his training at the AMU in Mhow.

Career
In 2014, at the ISSF World Cup in Munich, he won the silver medal in the 10 metre air pistol event. Following this, in Maribor, Rai won two medals; a silver in the 50 metre pistol event, and a gold in the 10 metre air pistol event. In the process, he won three medals in nine days at the World Cup and also became the first person to have won two medals at a single world cup for India. Following his achievements, he was ranked number 1 in the world, in 10 metre air pistol and number 4, in 50 metre pistol, in July 2014.

At the 2014 Commonwealth Games, Rai created the Games record in the qualification round of the 50 metre pistol event, having scored 562 points. He went on to win the gold medal in the event, scoring 194.1 points in the final, thus creating another Games record.

In the 2014 Asian Games held at Incheon in South Korea, Jitu won the gold medal in the 50 m pistol category. He also won a bronze in the men's 10 m air pistol team event.

In 2016, he won a silver medal at the ISSF World Cup held in Baku, Azerbaijan in the 10m Air Pistol event.

Jitu Rai had had a bad outing earlier in the 10m pistol event.

During the 2016 Olympics in the 10 M air pistol event, Jitu Rai made a remarkable comeback to sneak into the final, but failed to replicate his form as he finished last in the final of the 10 M air pistol event. The man from Lucknow lost the plot early on and could not recover, but was back for his favorite 50m pistol event on Wednesday. He made a flying start to the qualifiers with a 10-pointer, and then followed it up with two 9s. But that start did not last long as Jitu fell behind a bit with some mediocre shooting in the latter part. At one point, he dropped down to the 14th place after scoring 92 out of a possible 100 from the first round.
After a disappointing first round, Jitu Rai was back in his element, though. He hit three bullseyes to hit a 95 in the second round and take his total to 187 points. However, inconsistency did not leave Jitu Rai, as he struggled once again in the third round. He managed only 90 points in that round and dropped down to the 12th spot.
But, Jitu made up for the third round with some fantastic shooting in the fourth and the fifth. It was not to be in the end, though. After starting the last round in fourth place, he messed up his first three shots to slip to 6th. With only the top-8 qualifying for the final, he came back to 4th but again hit an 8 in the 6th shot. Another bad shot of 7 on the penultimate shot and he missed the final spot by a whisker. It was a disappointing slide to 12th spot after Jitu was firmly in finals territory.

At the 2018 Commonwealth Games, he broke the Commonwealth Games record for men's 10m air pistol with a total score of 235.1 points and secured his first Commonwealth Games gold medal in the relevant event. This was also Jitu Rai's second gold medal in Commonwealth Games.

Summer Olympics

See also
 Saniya Shaikh

References

External links
 Jitu Rai profile at ISSF

Living people
1987 births
Nepal
Nepalese emigrants to India
Indian people of Nepalese descent
Indian male sport shooters
Asian Games medalists in shooting
Lohorung people
Shooters at the 2014 Asian Games
Shooters at the 2014 Commonwealth Games
Shooters at the 2018 Commonwealth Games
Asian Games gold medalists for India
Asian Games bronze medalists for India
Commonwealth Games gold medallists for India
Olympic shooters of India
Shooters at the 2016 Summer Olympics
Recipients of the Khel Ratna Award
Commonwealth Games medallists in shooting
Medalists at the 2014 Asian Games
Recipients of the Padma Shri in sports
Recipients of the Arjuna Award
Rai people
Medallists at the 2014 Commonwealth Games
Medallists at the 2018 Commonwealth Games